Hamar Dagblad (1971-2022) was a weekly, free, local newspaper published in Hamar, Norway. It is part of Edda Media.

The newspaper was first published on 1 December 1971, with three weekly issues. In 2005 it was reorganized from a subscription to free newspaper, and is distributed to 17,000 households in Hamar, Furnes and Ottestad. Tore Svensrud is the editor-in-chief of the newspaper. On 21 June 2022, it was announced that the board of Østlendingen decided to nominate the newspaper from 1 July the same year.

References

Weekly newspapers published in Norway
Newspapers established in 1971
Mass media in Hamar
Companies based in Hamar
1971 establishments in Norway